Light Reflections was a Brazilian band that performed in the 1970s.

Biography

The band appeared in 1972 in São Paulo under the name Tobruk, and was formed by André Barbosa Filho (vocals and guitar, used the pseudonym Brian Anderson), Marc Mane (organ and guitar), Ricky Taylor (bass, piano and moog) and Billy Rogers (drums). By contractual requirement, the group sang in English.

His greatest success was Tell Me Once Again, and it sold one million copies of the LP One Way, released in 1973, in addition to several shows in Latin America. Another hit of the group was Welcome, Welcome. In their career, Light Reflections recorded 2 LPs and 8 singles.

Discography

Album

1973 - One Way

Singles & EPs

 1972 - Tell Me Once Again
 1973 - Welcome, Welcome
 1974 - Dime Una Vez Más / Mía Solo Mía
 1974 - Light Reflections
 1974 - My Great Love
 1974 - My Great Love (EP)
 1975 - Sweet Love/Please
 1981 - Let's Fall In Love

Compilations

 1999 - The Essential Of

References

External Links
 The Light Reflections - Discogs

English-language musical groups from Brazil
Brazilian pop music groups
Musical groups from São Paulo (state)
Musical groups established in 1972
Musical groups disestablished in 1981